William Cooper Thompson (born January 1962) is the presiding judge on the Alabama Court of Civil Appeals. He was first elected to the court in November 1996.  He is the currently the longest tenured Judge in Alabama among all three of the state's statewide elected courts.

Education
Thompson received his Bachelor of Arts degree from the University of Alabama and his Juris Doctor from Cumberland School of Law at Samford University. Graduated from Stanhope Elmore High School.

Legal career
Thompson practiced law in both Birmingham and Montgomery, including serving as the assistant legal advisor to the Governor of Alabama.

Alabama court service
He was elected to the Court of Civil Appeals in 1996 and was reelected to the court in 2002, 2008, 2014, and 2020. He became presiding judge of the Court of Civil Appeals in 2007.

Personal
Thompson is a registered Republican.

References

External links

1962 births
Living people
20th-century American judges
21st-century American judges
Alabama lawyers
Alabama Republicans
Alabama state court judges
University of Alabama alumni
Cumberland School of Law alumni